Silverado is a residential neighbourhood in the southwest quadrant of Calgary, Alberta. It is located near the southern edge of the city, south of Stoney Trail, east of the equestrian sports facility Spruce Meadows, West of Sheriff King Street and North of 194 Avenue S.W.

Silverado is represented in the Calgary City Council by the Ward 13 councillor.

Development controversy
Prior to the commencement of development of Silverado, the owners of nearby Spruce Meadows pushed for a wetlands development to be established between the residential area and the show-jumping facility. Calgary City Council approved the wetlands proposal in 2004, along with a request that one of the major roads leading into Spruce Meadows not be upgraded to a residential collector street, although Spruce Meadows was unsuccessful in getting the city to increase the setback between Silverado and the facility.

Construction of homes in the community began in 2005.

Demographics

LRT network expansion 
Two new LRT stations will be built in the area as the Red Line is planned to be extended from Somerset-Bridlewood to Silverado and a second station ending at 210 Avenue SW. Construction will begin when funding is available and when these areas are sufficient enough to support LRT infrastructure.

See also
List of neighbourhoods in Calgary

References

External links
Silverado Community Home Page
Silverado Real Estate Statistics and Housing Information

Neighbourhoods in Calgary